Fluminicola is a fungal genus in the family Papulosaceae of the Ascomycota. The relationship of this taxon to other taxa within the Sordariomycetes class is unknown (incertae sedis), and it has not yet been placed with certainty into any order. This is was a monotypic genus, containing the single species Fluminicola bipolaris until new species were found in 2017 and 2021.

It was originally placed in the Annulatascaceae family but in 2020 it was placed in the Papulosaceae family due to an updated classification.

Species
As accepted by Species Fungorum;
 Fluminicola aquatica 
 Fluminicola bipolaris 
 Fluminicola saprophytica 
 Fluminicola striata 
 Fluminicola thailandensis

References

Sordariomycetes
Taxa described in 1998
Sordariomycetes genera